Shigeyuki Nakarai (born March 11, 2002), also known mononymously as Shigekix, is a Japanese breakdancer. He participated at the 2022 World Games in the dancesport competition where he won the bronze medal in the B-Boys event.

References 

2002 births
Living people
Place of birth missing (living people)
Japanese male dancers
Breakdancers
World Games bronze medalists
Competitors at the 2022 World Games
20th-century Japanese people
21st-century Japanese people
Breakdancers at the 2018 Summer Youth Olympics
Medalists at the 2018 Summer Youth Olympics